David Howie (15 July 1886 – 1930) was a Scottish professional footballer who played mainly as an inside left.

Born in Galston, East Ayrshire, he started his career in his hometown with Galston Athletic in the junior leagues. He later moved to Kilmarnock before moving to England to sign for Bradford Park Avenue on a free transfer at the start of the 1911–12 season. Howie continued to play for the club for the next 14 seasons, although he missed four years of his career due to the First World War. His brother James was also a footballer who played for Kilmarnock, as well as for Newcastle United and Scotland.

References

1886 births
1930 deaths
Scottish footballers
Association football inside forwards
Kilmarnock F.C. players
Bradford (Park Avenue) A.F.C. players
English Football League players
Footballers from East Ayrshire
Scottish Football League players
Hull City A.F.C. wartime guest players
Scottish Junior Football Association players